Emirate of Smyrna is a historiographic term that can refer to:

 the short-lived lordship established by the Turkish warlord Tzachas in 1088, and was reconquered by the Byzantines in 1097
 the later Turkish Aydınid emirate, that held Smyrna for much of its existence